Trichostachys is a genus of plant in the family Rubiaceae. It contains the following species:

 Trichostachys interrupta K.Schum.

References 

 
Rubiaceae genera
Taxonomy articles created by Polbot